Üçadalar are three Mediterranean islets of Turkey. Üçadalar is a composite word meaning "three islands". The islands are part of the Kemer district of Antalya Province. They are situated to the west of the Gulf of Antalya.

References

Mediterranean islands
Islands of Turkey
Kemer District
Islands of Antalya Province